Calophyllum macrophyllum is a species of flowering plant in the Calophyllaceae family. It is found only in Maluku, Indonesia.

References

macrophyllum
Endemic flora of the Maluku Islands
Vulnerable plants
Taxonomy articles created by Polbot